The Men's 4 x 100 metres relay at the 2010 Commonwealth Games as part of the athletics programme was held at the Jawaharlal Nehru Stadium on Monday 11 October and Tuesday 12 October 2010.

Records
The following records were in place before the competition

Round 1
First 2 in each heat (Q) and 2 best performers (q) advance to the Final.

Heat 1

Heat 2

Heat 3

Final

External links
2010 Commonwealth Games - Athletics

Men's 4 x 100
2010